(TPMP), literally "Don't Touch My TV Set!", is a French live television talk show. It is broadcast on C8 and produced by  Productions. The show, hosted by Cyril Hanouna, deals with media news; it is broadcast from Monday to Friday at 8:30 p.m.

History 

Hanouna created " Productions" in March 2010 to produce his own TV program. In 2010 he created the talk show "TPMP" which was first broadcast on France 4. In May 2012, Touche pas à mon poste! was transferred to the new channel, D8. The program offers a new formula, with new sequences led by Camille Combal, or Bertrand Chameroy accompanied by Nicolas Bouvard and occasionally Vincent Desagnat. The show is now presented by Cyril Hanouna from Monday to Friday.

Columnists (C8)

Current columnists (season 9)

Quasi-daily columnists 

 Benjamin Castaldi (2016–present)
 Jean-Michel Maire (2010–present)
 Isabelle Morini-Bosc (2013–present)
 Gilles Verdez (2013–present)

Frequent columnists 

 Kelly Vedovelli (2017–present)
 Valérie Bénaïm (2012–present)
 Maxime Guény (2017–present)
 Géraldine Maillet (2016–present)
 Bernard Montiel (2014–present)
 Danielle Moreau (2017, 2018–present)

Occasional columnists 

 Raymond Aabou (2017, 2018–present)
 Magali Berdah (2017–present)
 Ludivine Rétory (2017–present)

Former columnists (season 1 to 11) 

 Capucine Anav (2016–2017)
 Rachid Arhab (2017)
 Agathe Auproux (2017–2019)
 Nadège Beausson-Diagne (2014–2016)
 Nabilla Benattia (2014, 2018)
 Igor and Grichka Bogdanoff (2017)
 Booder (2018)  
 Damien Canivez (2016–2017)
 Christophe Carrière (2010–2017)
 Sébastien Cauet (2016–2017)
 Bertrand Chameroy (2012–2016, 2018) 
 Elise Chassaing (2012–2013)
 Camille Combal (2012–2018)
 Julien Courbet (2014–2018) 
 Matthieu Delormeau (2015–2020)
 Estelle Denis (2015–2017)
 Miguel Derrenes (2014–2015)
 Rokhaya Diallo (2017–2018)
 Issa Doumbia (2015–2017)
 Dominique Farrugia (2017)
 Laurent Fontaine (2014)
 Justine Fraïoli (2011–2012, 2014–2016)
 Elodie Gossuin (2010–2012, 2014)
 Christine Kelly (2018–2019)
 Alexia Laroche-Joubert (2012–2013)
 Caroline Ithurbide (2015–2017)
 Annie Lemoine (2013)
 Jean-Luc Lemoine (2011–2018)
 Emilie Lopez (2015–2017)
 Angela Lorente (2015)
 Gérard Louvin (2012–2014, 2015)
 Énora Malagré (2010–2017)
 Emmanuel Maubert (2014–2015)
 Pierre Ménès (2017)
 Thierry Moreau (2010–2017)
 Erika Moulet (2015–2016) 
 François Ouisse (2012–2013)
 Renaud Revel (2017)
 Nicolas Rey (2012–2013)
 La Fouine (2015)
 Titoff (2017–2018)
 Phillipe Vandel (2012–2014)
 François Viot (2010–2012, 2014–2017)
Delphine Wespiser (2018–2019)

Convictions 

 In June 2017, the show was ordered to suspend all advertising for 3 weeks for two incriminating acts after the show "seriously disregarded its obligation to exercise restraint in the dissemination of images likely to humiliate people. and "misunderstood the provisions of the law of September 30, 1986 against stereotypes, sexist prejudices, degrading images and violence against women".
 In July 2017, the show was fined 3 million euros for a homophobic prank and "having resorted to numerous clichés and stereotypical attitudes about homosexual people". It is considered that by broadcasting this sequence, the company "has seriously disregarded the principle of respect for private life, as well as its obligation to fight against discrimination".
 In February 2020, the show was ordered to pay a fine of 10,000 euros to Karine Ferri after the publication of photographs of her bare.
 In February 2021, the show was put on notice for clandestine advertising.
 In November 2022, the show is put on notice for its handling of the Lola judiciary affair, where Cyril Hanouna called for the suspect of the murder to be executed without trial.

Far right support 
Claire Sécail, a researcher at the French National Center for Scientific Research (CNRS) published a study showing that the program "massively" favored the far right during the 2022 French presidential election. As an example, Eric Zemmour, the far-right candidate who scored 7%, received 44% of the airtime on the show while Jean-Luc Mélenchon, the left-wing candidate who scored 21%, received only 1. 2% of the airtime. The difference was not only in the airtime but also in the treatment accorded to the candidates, with far-right candidates all receiving privileged treatment while candidates from the left or Emmanuel Macron consistently receiving negative treatment.

The French Senate has opened an inquiry upon Touche pas à mon poste ! among other news networks that tried to promote far-right views.

Guests 

Usually, the show welcomes two guests. They are often journalists, singers, actors, hosts or humorists.

Some political personalities have participated to the show, such as: Jean-Luc Mélenchon, Najat Vallaud-Belkacem, Jack Lang and David Douillet.

The TV show has also welcomed international celebrities like Jermaine Jackson, Cher, James Blunt, Eva Longoria, David Guetta, Anastacia, Gary Dourdan, Conchita Wurst, Lenny Kravitz, Nicole Scherzinger, Vanessa Hudgens, Tokio Hotel, Seal, Sacha Baron Cohen, Julian Perretta and the comedians of Violetta.

American singer Cris Cab participated in a film clip in June with Tefa (who used to be TPMP's DJ). He appeared on the show in 2015 to sing his cover of "English Man in New York" live. Meanwhile, Canadian singer Justin Bieber, participated in a sequence where he was interviewed by Cyril Hanouna (Cyril gave Justin his jacket as a present but forgot his credit card in it; he later said that he really left it in the jacket and that it wasn't a joke).

Audience 
On 22 April 2010, less than a month after its launch, TPMP had already garnered success for a show airing on a small TV channel like France 4, as 226,000 people were watching it regularly.

In December 2012, the TV show was watched by 700,000 people regularly on D8.

On 29 January 2016, 1,975,000 watched the TV program, the show's historic audience record. That day, Cyril and his team hosted Benabar and Pascal Demelon.

Prime-time program 

Originally, the 20 November 2015 program was having a paranormal theme, but that program has been replaced by a special program to honor the victims of the terrorist attacks of 13 November 2015 in France (Touche pas à mon poste! it's only love). Finally, the program based on the paranormal is broadcast live in access prime time. Apart from the special program "Touche pas à mon poste ! it's only love" all the emission were cancelled.

Special programs 
None of these were presented by Cyril Hanouna

International versions

Awards 
2015: Prize-winner of the best entertainment show (ceremony of the gold price of the TNT)

Bibliography

References

External links 
  (France)
  (Belgium)
  (Italy)
  (Lebanon)
 

2010 French television series debuts
French television talk shows